Orlo Allen Sundre (born March 15, 1932) is a former American football coach. He served as the head football coach at Ellendale State Teachers—later known as the North Dakota State Normal and Industrial School—in Ellendale, North Dakota from 1961 to 1962 and Dickinson State College—now known as Dickinson State University–in Dickinson, North Dakota from 1966 to 1967, compiling a career college football coaching record of 4–27.

Sundre graduated from Mahnomen High School in Mahnomen, Minnesota and Mayville Teacher's College—now known as Mayville State University—in Mayville, North Dakota. He earned a master's degree from the University of North Dakota in 1960. At Ellendale, Sundre also was the head wrestling and track coach. He returned to Mayville State in 1963 as head coach in wrestling, golf, and tennis. He was also an assistant football coach at Mayville State for three seasons, from 1963 to 1965.

Head coaching record

Football

References

1932 births
Living people
Dickinson State Blue Hawks football coaches
Ellendale Dusties football coaches
Mayville State Comets football coaches
North Dakota Fighting Hawks football coaches
North Dakota Fighting Hawks men's basketball coaches
College golf coaches in the United States
College tennis coaches in the United States
College track and field coaches in the United States
College wrestling coaches in the United States
Mayville State University alumni
University of North Dakota alumni
People from Mahnomen County, Minnesota
People from Ellendale, North Dakota
Coaches of American football from Minnesota
Basketball coaches from Minnesota